"Shake the Disease" is a song by English electronic music band Depeche Mode, released as a single on 29 April 1985. "Shake the Disease" was one of two new songs on the 1985 compilation albums The Singles 81→85 and Catching Up with Depeche Mode, along with the band's subsequent single "It's Called a Heart".

Song information
Band member Alan Wilder felt this song captured the essence of the band, saying that "there's a certain edge to what we do that can make people think twice about things. If we've got a choice between calling a song 'Understand Me' or 'Shake the Disease', we'll call it 'Shake the Disease'. There's a lot of perversity and innuendo in our lyrics, but nothing direct."

Music video
The music video is the first Depeche Mode video directed by Peter Care, and features a camera trick that makes the band members appear to slowly tip over. It was shot in the Docklands area of London, prominently featuring the cranes that were still in situ at that time. Between May and July 1985 the video was performed on 10 television programs across Europe.

Commercial performance
"Shake the Disease" reached number 18 on the UK Singles Chart, while charting within the top 10 in Ireland, Sweden, Switzerland and West Germany. In France, it peaked at number 13, spending six months in the top 50. The track also reached number 33 on the Hot Dance/Disco 12 Inch Singles Sales chart in the United States.

It reached number one on the KROQ Top 106.7 Countdown of 1985.

Track listings
All tracks are written by Martin L. Gore.

7-inch single
A. "Shake the Disease" – 4:48
B. "Flexible" – 3:11

US and Canadian 7-inch single
A. "Shake the Disease" (Fade) – 3:59
B. "Flexible" – 3:09

12-inch single
A. "Shake the Disease" (Remixed Extended Version) – 8:44 (engineered by Flood)
B. "Flexible" (Remixed Extended Version) – 6:15 (engineered by Flood)

12-inch single (special edition)
French and Italian cassette maxi single
A1. "Shake the Disease" (Edit the Shake) – 7:10
A2. "Master and Servant" (live) – 5:37
B1. "Flexible" (Pre-Deportation Mix) – 4:40 (remixed by Bert Bevans)
B2. "Something to Do" (Metalmix) – 7:26 (remixed by Gareth Jones)

"Master and Servant" was recorded at the Basel, Switzerland, show on 30 November 1984.

1988 French CD single
"Shake the Disease" (Edit the Shake) – 7:10
"Master and Servant" (live) – 5:37
"Flexible" (Pre-Deportation Mix) – 4:39 (remixed by Bert Bevans)
"Something to Do" (Metalmix) – 7:26 (remixed by Gareth Jones)
"Shake the Disease" (7″ mix) – 4:49

1990 Belgian and German CD single
"Shake the Disease" (Edit the Shake) – 7:09
"Master and Servant" (Live) – 5:38
"Flexible" (Pre-Deportation Mix) – 4:40 (remixed by Bert Bevans)
"Something to Do" (Metalmix) – 7:25 (remixed by Gareth Jones)

1991 CD single
"Shake the Disease" – 4:47
"Flexible" – 3:10
"Shake the Disease" (Remixed Extended) – 8:45
"Flexible" (Remixed Extended) – 6:16
"Shake the Disease" (Edit the Shake) – 7:10
"Something to Do" (Metalmix) – 7:27

The UK CD single was also released as part of the 3 (Singles 13–18) box set compilations.

Charts

Weekly charts

Year-end charts

References

External links
 Single information from the official Depeche Mode website
 AllMusic review 

1985 songs
1985 singles
Depeche Mode songs
Mute Records singles
Song recordings produced by Daniel Miller
Song recordings produced by Gareth Jones
Songs written by Martin Gore
UK Independent Singles Chart number-one singles